Denis Constantin Dumitrașcu (born 27 April 1995) is a Romanian professional footballer who plays as a defender for Liga I club Chindia Târgoviște. Born in Râmnicu Vâlcea, Dumitrașcu started his career at the local team, CSM Râmnicu Vâlcea for which played 50 matches and scored 1 goal in 3 and a half seasons of Liga II.

Honours
Chindia Târgoviște
Liga II: 2018–19

References

External links
 

1995 births
Living people
Sportspeople from Râmnicu Vâlcea
Romanian footballers
Association football defenders
Romania youth international footballers
Liga II players
SCM Râmnicu Vâlcea players
AFC Chindia Târgoviște players
FC Argeș Pitești players